The 2012 Colonial Athletic Association baseball tournament was held at Eagle Field at Veterans Memorial Park in Harrisonburg, Virginia, from May 23 through 26.  The top six finishers from the regular season competed in the double-elimination tournament.  Top seeded  won their third title and earned the Colonial Athletic Association's automatic bid to the 2012 NCAA Division I baseball tournament.

Seeding and format
This was the first year of the six team format, as previous seasons consisted of a four team tournament.  The top six teams from the regular season, based on conference winning percentage, made the field.

Bracket

All-Tournament Team
The following players were named to the All-Tournament Team.

Most Outstanding Player
Jimmy Yezzo was named Tournament Most Outstanding Player.  Yezzo was a first baseman for Delaware, and set a tournament record with 15 hits while batting .571, scoring ten runs, and driving in 11.

References

Tournament
Colonial Athletic Association Baseball Tournament
Colonial Athletic Association baseball tournament
Colonial Athletic Association baseball tournament
Baseball in Virginia
College sports in Virginia
Sports competitions in Virginia
Tourist attractions in Harrisonburg, Virginia